Tigaon may refer to:

 Tigaon, Camarines Sur, Philippines
 Tigaon (Vidhan Sabha constituency), India